Sorocea guilleminiana is a species of plant in the family Moraceae. It is native to South America.

References

Trees of Brazil
Trees of Peru
guilleminiana
Vulnerable plants
Taxonomy articles created by Polbot